Amir Muchtari (אמיר מוכתרי; born June 12, 1972) is an Israeli former basketball player. He was named to the 2000 Israeli Basketball Premier League Quintet.

Biography
Muchtari was born in Kfar Saba, Israel.

He played for Hapoel Jerusalem, Hapoel Galil Elyon, and Bnei Herzliya Basket. Muchtari was named to the 2000 Israeli Basketball Premier League Quintet.

Muchtari also played for the Israel men's national basketball team.

After his retirement he entered the real estate business, however his real estate group collapsed in 2020.

References 

Living people

Hapoel Jerusalem B.C. players

1972 births
Hapoel Galil Elyon players
Israeli men's basketball players
People from Kfar Saba